The Buffalo Courier-Express was a morning newspaper in Buffalo, New York. It ceased publication on September 19, 1982.

History

The Courier-Express was created in 1926 by a merger of the Buffalo Daily Courier and the Buffalo Morning Express. William James Conners, the owner of the Buffalo Courier, brought the two papers together. The combined newspapers claimed a heritage dating to 1828. One notable part-owner and editor of the Buffalo Express was Samuel Langhorne Clemens, also known as Mark Twain, whose tenure at the newspaper lasted from 1869 to 1871.

In August 1979, The Courier-Express was purchased by the Cowles Media Company, a publishing company based in Minneapolis, Minnesota. After a change in corporate leadership, Cowles Media decided to close the paper in September 1982. After the local Newspaper Guild members voted to oppose a deal to sell the Courier Express to Rupert Murdoch's News Corporation, the September 19, 1982 issue was the last issue published. That left Buffalo with only one daily newspaper, the Buffalo Evening News, now known as The Buffalo News.

Cowles Media donated the library to the Buffalo History Museum and Buffalo State College. The library is now housed in the E. H. Butler Library at Buffalo State College. The library consists of approximately one million news clippings, 100,000 photographs and several pieces of artworks and framed photographs. The news clippings and photographs, arranged by subject and person, cover the late 1950s to September 19, 1982. The collection served as the library for the reporters of the paper. The librarians weeded both the clippings and photographic files, discarding older files on a routine basis. As a result, many subject areas are not covered.

The library is currently being digitized. While that may take years, photographs will continually be added to the Butler Library Archives Flickr site.

Editors

Editors of the Buffalo Courier
 Douglas A. Levien, 1850s
 David Gray, 1870s

Editors of the Buffalo Express
 Almon M. Clapp, editor, founded Express in 1846
 Samuel Langhorne Clemens, also known as 'Mark Twain', 1869–1871, co-editor
 Josephus Nelson Larned, co-editor with Twain
 James N. Matthews, 1878–1888
 George E. Matthews, 1888–1911
 Burrows Matthews, 1911–1925

Editors of the Buffalo Courier-Express 
 Burrows Matthews, 1926–1955
 Cy B. King, 1956–1970
 Douglas L. Turner, 1971–1980
 Joel R. Kramer, 1981–1982
 Theo C. Meier, 1950s

General Managers of the Buffalo Courier-Express 
 Gordon Bennett, 1960s
 Richard C. Lyons, 1971–74
 Donald J. Maul, 1970s

Notable alumni
Tom Toles
 Wilbur Porterfield, photo pictorialist, 1926–1958

See also
 Buffalo State College

References

External links

 History of the Buffalo Newspaper Guild
 As of October 2022, NY State Historic Newspapers has the Courier-Express, 1977-1982 available online for free, public access.
As of October, 2022, Newspapers.com has the Courier-Express, 1932-1943, online for paid subscribers. Some public and academic libraries offer Newspapers.com to their users.
 Buffalo Courier-Express Collection at Buffalo State College

History of Buffalo, New York
Publications established in 1926
Defunct newspapers published in New York (state)
Newspapers published in Buffalo, New York
Publications disestablished in 1982
1926 establishments in New York (state)
1982 disestablishments in New York (state)
Daily newspapers published in New York (state)